The 1976 Swedish speedway season was the 1976 season of motorcycle speedway in Sweden.

Individual

Individual Championship
The 1976 Swedish Individual Speedway Championship final was held on 24 September in Vetlanda. Anders Michanek won the Swedish Championship for the third time.

Junior Championship
 
Winner - Jan Davidsson

Team

Team Championship
Njudungarna won division 1 and were declared the winners of the Swedish Speedway Team Championship for the first time. The Njudungarna team included Lars-Åke Andersson, Christer Löfqvist, Conny Samuelsson and Bo Wirebrand.

Örnarna won the second division, while Eldarna and Solkatterna won the third division north and south respectively.

See also 
 Speedway in Sweden

References

Speedway leagues
Professional sports leagues in Sweden
Swedish
Seasons in Swedish speedway